Nathaniel Hill may refer to:

Nathaniel P. Hill (1832–1900), United States Senator from Colorado
Nathaniel Hill (artist) (1861–1934), Irish impressionist

See also
Nate Hill (disambiguation)